Realization, also called Biographie, is a circa  sport climbing route on a limestone cliff on the southern face of Céüse mountain, near Gap and Sigoyer, in France. It is considered an historic and important route in rock climbing, and one of the most attempted climbs at its grade.

History

In 1989, French climber Jean-Christophe Lafaille bolted the whole circa 35 metre pitch, and named it Biographie (he did not climb it).  In 1996, French climber  freed the lower half, adding an anchor at his high-point and grading it .  Petit estimated that the remaining unclimbed section was about  but had a very difficult 7C boulder problem that he could not overcome.  American climber Chris Sharma made over 30 attempts from 1996 to 2000 but could also not overcome the boulder move.  In 2001, Sharma skipped the Bouldering World Cup in Gap to concentrate on the climb, and after 3 days trying on 18 July 2001, successfully free climbed the route, linking up Petit's first section to Lafaille's final bolt.

Sharma's first ascent was captured in Josh Lowell's 2002 climbing film, Dosage Volume 1.

Sharma did not assign a grade the climb. however he did name it Realization. The naming was a source of controversy as in France climbing routes are named by the person who first bolted the route, while in the U.S. (and the U.K.), they are named by the first person to successfully free climb the route.  Sharma would later clarify: 

Though only aged 20, Sharma considered retiring after completing the ascent, but found new inspiration in extreme deep-water soloing routes in Mallorca.  It took almost three years until the second ascent was made by French climber, Sylvain Millet, who also refused to grade it given his lack of experience of other equivalent reference climbs, however, he noted that the failure of other strong climbers to repeat the route (e.g. Patxi Usobiaga, and  Dave Graham), implied that 9a+ was the likely grade.

On 24 September 2017, American climber Margo Hayes became the first female climber to climb the route.

On 5 August 2020, German climber Alexander Megos created Bibliographie, a  route, a few metres to the right of Realization/Biographie.

Route

The route starts with an immediate hard "four-move boulder problem", which partially broke in 2010, potentially rendering the lower section even more difficult (it has been compared to the notable bouldering problem, Necessarily Evil). Sustained 5.13 climbing after the initial bouldering problem leads to the main rest, a large right-facing flake. After this pause, a series of "super-resistant two and three-finger pocket moves", with cross-throughs, underclings, and high-steps lead to Arnaud Petit's old anchor (now since removed), which is just under halfway. 

To the anchor, the route is considered , although some have suggested an upgrade to  due to the initial bottom boulder breaking. There is a small rest at the old anchor, then sustained resistance climbing leads to a slightly better rest just below the finishing crux. This final crux is 12 moves, described as "a bunch of foot movement, and some very fickle pockets and crimps". Its difficulty is amplified by the amount of hard climbing undertaken to reach it.  Above this crux is a small rest, and 5.11 climbing for 50-feet leads to the final anchor at around the circa 35-meter mark".

Legacy

Realization became the world's first route to carry a consensus  grade, and Climbing chronicled that it delivered a "technical revolution" in rock climbing. Climbing author Andrew Bisharat noted in a 2016 essay on regrading, that "The other interesting point about Open Air that’s worth mentioning is that the route reportedly contains some rather flaky holds that have broken off over the years. So was the Open Air that Ondra climbed the exact same route that Alex Huber climbed? Maybe, but probably not." 

The quality and sustained difficulty of the route means it is still considered an important rite-of-passage for the world's best rock climbers, whose repeat ascents of the "legendary" route, are often covered by the climbing media. In 2014, National Geographic called it, "one of the most famous sport-climbing routes in the world". PlanetMountain included Realization on its list of important climbs in the evolution of free climbing (1918–2013).

In 2012, when Adam Ondra attempted to flash the route (i.e. complete on the first attempt) he said: "It had always been my long-term crazy dream to flash this route". In 2014, when climber Jonathan Siegrist made the eighth ascent of the route and told Outside magazine: "I can remember the first time that I saw the route — it is truly magnificent. I was shocked to see that such a bold and impressive, seemingly perfect line exists. Add to that, the historic significance of this climb, not to mention its unique and brilliant holds and movement — it really is a proud route". On repeating the route in 2014, German climber Alexander Megos said: "I wanted to climb this route because it is the world’s first 9a+ and definitely one of the most famous routes worldwide! But it’s not just the history behind the route, also the route itself is one of the best ones I ever climbed!". In 2016, remembering his own 2015 repeat of the route, Italian climber Stefano Ghisolfi called it, "..perhaps the most famous cutting-edge route in the world".

Ascents
Realization, or Biographie, has been ascended by:

 1st. Chris Sharma on July 18, 2001
 2nd. Sylvain Millet on May 24, 2004
 3rd. Patxi Usobiaga on July 29, 2004
 4th. Dave Graham on July 30, 2007
 5th. Ethan Pringle on September 2, 2007
 6th. Ramón Puigblanque on July 27, 2008
 7th.  on August 15, 2010
 8th. Jonathan Siegrist on June 1, 2014
 9th. Alex Megos on July 11, 2014
 10th. Adam Ondra on July 22, 2014
 11th. Sachi Amma on August 7, 2014
 12th. Stefano Ghisolfi on June 22, 2015
 13th. Jon Cardwell on May 25, 2016
 14th. Sean Bailey on August 5, 2016
 15th. Margo Hayes on September 24, 2017
 16th. Piotr Schab on July 3, 2018
 17th.  on September 22, 2018
 18th. Jorge Díaz-Rullo on July 13, 2019
19th Sébastien Bouin on June 13, 2020

Filmography
 Chris Sharma's first ascent: 
 Jonathan Siegrist's 8th ascent: 
 Margo Hayes' first female and 15th ascent:  
 Seb Bouin's 19th ascent:

See also

History of rock climbing
List of first ascents (sport climbing)
Silence, first climb in the world with a potential grade of 
La Dura Dura, second climb in the world with a consensus grade of 
Jumbo Love, first climb in the world with a consensus grade of 
La Rambla, popular , that forms the coveted "9a+ Trilogy" with Realization/Biographie and Papichulo
Action Directe, first climb in the world with a consensus grade of 
 Hubble, first climb in the world with a consensus grade of

Notes

References

Further reading

External links
Chris Sharma, World's First 5.15, Big UP Productions (May 2002)

Climbing routes
2001 in sport climbing
Climbing areas of France
Sport in Hautes-Alpes
Sport climbing